Cyclin-dependent kinase inhibitor 3 is an enzyme that in humans is encoded by the CDKN3 gene.

The protein encoded by this gene belongs to the dual specificity protein phosphatase family. It was identified as a cyclin-dependent kinase inhibitor, and has been shown to interact with, and dephosphorylate CDK2 kinase, thus prevent the activation of CDK2 kinase. This gene was reported to be deleted, mutated, or overexpressed in several kinds of cancers.

Interactions
CDKN3 has been shown to interact with Cyclin-dependent kinase 2, Cdk1 and MS4A3.

References

Further reading

External links